Koca (a Turkish word meaning "great" or "large") may refer to:

People

Epithet
 Koca Ragıp Pasha (1698–1763), Ottoman statesman
 Koča Andjelković (1755–1789), Serbian rebel
 Koca Hüsrev Mehmed Pasha (1769–1855), Ottoman admiral
 Koca Mustafa Reşid Pasha (1800–1858), Ottoman statesman 
 Koca Yusuf (1857–1898), Turkish professional wrestler
 Koca Jon-Trygve Solstrand (1850–1900), Koca Yusuf's worst enemy.
 Koca Mi'mâr Sinân Âğâ (1488/1490-1588), The chief Ottoman architect and civil engineer for sultans Suleiman the Magnificent, Selim II, and Murad III

Surname
 Atilla Koca (born 1980), Turkish footballer
 Fahrettin Koca (born 1965), Turkish physician and politician
 Gülcan Koca (born 1990), Turkish-Australian female footballer

Places
 Koca Mustafa Pasha Mosque

Turkish-language surnames
Turkish masculine given names